Róaldur Jakobsen (born 23 January 1991) is a Faroese international footballer who plays for B36, as a midfielder.

Career
Jakobsen has played club football for B36. He has won the Faroese championship with B36 Tórshavn three times, in 2011, 2014 and 2015.

He made his international debut for Faroe Islands in 2014 and scored his first goal against Hungary, one year later on 8 October 2015.

International goals
Scores and results list Faroe Islands' goal tally first.

References

External links 

 
 Róaldur Jakobsens profile on Faroesoccer.com

1991 births
Living people
People from Tórshavn
Faroese footballers
Faroe Islands international footballers
B36 Tórshavn players
Association football midfielders
Faroe Islands youth international footballers